The canton of Sartenais-Valinco is an administrative division of the Corse-du-Sud department, southeastern France. It was created at the French canton reorganisation which came into effect in March 2015. Its seat is in Propriano.

It consists of the following communes:

Altagène
Arbellara
Aullène
Belvédère-Campomoro
Bilia
Cargiaca
Foce
Fozzano
Giuncheto
Granace
Grossa
Loreto-di-Tallano
Mela
Olmeto
Olmiccia
Propriano 
Quenza
Sainte-Lucie-de-Tallano
Santa-Maria-Figaniella
Sartène
Serra-di-Scopamène
Sorbollano
Viggianello
Zérubia
Zoza

References

Cantons of Corse-du-Sud